Coleophora albadomina is a moth of the family Coleophoridae that was first described by Giorgio Baldizzone and Hugo van der Wolf in 2004. It is endemic to Namibia.

References

External links

albadomina
Moths described in 2004
Endemic fauna of Namibia
Moths of Africa